The Athabasca Tribal Council is a tribal council representing five First Nation band governments in the province of Alberta. The organization is based in Fort McMurray, Alberta.

Demographics
As of August 2016, there were 6,807 registered members in the 5 First Nation bands.

Members
 Athabasca Chipewyan First Nation had 1,200 registered members in August 2016.
 Fort McKay First Nation had 851 registered members in August 2016.
 Chipewyan Prairie First Nation had 923 registered members in August 2016.
 Fort McMurray First Nation had 763 registered members in August 2016.
 Mikisew Cree First Nation had 3,070 registered members in August 2016.

References

External links
Official website

First Nations tribal councils
First Nations in Alberta
Organizations based in Alberta
Fort McMurray